– literally "racing cycle" – is a form of motor-paced cycle racing in which track cyclists sprint for victory following a speed-controlled start behind a motorized or non-motorized pacer. It was developed in Japan around 1948 for gambling purposes and became an official event at the 2000 Olympics in Sydney, Australia.

Riders use brakeless fixed-gear bicycles.
Lots are drawn to determine starting positions for the sprint riders behind the pacer, which is usually a motorcycle, but can be a derny, electric bicycle or tandem bicycle. Riders must remain behind the pacer for 3 laps on a  track. The pacer leaves the track  before the end of the race (3 laps on a  track). The winner's finishing speed can exceed .

Competition keirin races are conducted over several rounds with one final. Some eliminated cyclists can try again in the repechages.

World championships

Keirin, in its modified form, has been a UCI men's World Championship event since 1980 and a UCI women's World Championship event since 2002. Danny Clark of Australia and Li Na of China were the first UCI world champions. The 2019 men's and women's world champions are Matthijs Büchli of Netherlands and Lee Wai Sze of Hong Kong.

Olympics
Keirin made its debut at the 2000 Summer Olympics in Sydney as a men's event, after being admitted into the Olympics in December 1996. The women's event was added for the 2012 Summer Olympics in London.

A BBC News investigation, reported in July 2008, found evidence that following admission into the Olympics, the Union Cycliste Internationale required (in writing) the Japan Keirin Association to support UCI projects in "material terms"; over a period of time the association subsequently gave US$3 million to UCI in consideration of "the excellent relationship the UCI has with representatives of the Olympic movement". The UCI and its then-president, Hein Verbruggen, denied any wrongdoing.

At the Tokyo 2020 Olympics, the Men's keirin took place on 7 and 8 August 2021, with 30 cyclists from 18 nations competing, and the gold medal going to Jason Kenny from Great Britain.  The Women's keirin took place on 4 and 5 August 2021, with 29 cyclists from 18 nations competing, and the gold medal going to Shanne Braspennincx from The Netherlands.

 Men

Women

Keirin in Japan 

Track cycling began as one of four allowed betting sports in Japan in 1948, and has since become very popular there. In 1957, the Nihon Jitensha Shinkōkai (NJS;  Japan Bicycle Association) was founded to establish a uniform system of standards for the sport in Japan. Today keirin racing is regulated by the JKA Foundation. In 2011, the sum of bets placed on keirin races exceeded ¥600 billion  (approximately US$5 billion), and the number of attendees in the races was approximately 4.9 million people.

Aspiring professional keirin riders in Japan compete for entrance into the Japan Keirin School. The 10 percent of applicants who are accepted then undergo a strict 15-hours-per-day training regimen. Those who pass the graduation exams and are approved by the NJS become eligible for professional keirin races in Japan.

Japanese races for women were reintroduced in July 2012, under the title of Girl's Keirin (ガールズケイリン). Women were previously permitted to participate from 1949 until 1964. Like the men, the women must also undergo a strict training regimen at the Keirin School.

Champions from Japan
 was one of the first Japanese keirin athletes to compete outside of his native country, Nakano holds the best matched sprint record as a track cyclist at the UCI Track World Championships with a record of ten consecutive professional Sprint World Track Cycling Championship wins from 1977 to 1986 against mostly western European pro track cyclists, although he never won the Keirin World Championship. At that time, many leading sprint riders were from the Eastern bloc countries and competed in separate "amateur" events.

Katsuaki Matsumoto (1928-2021) is the all-time professional keirin athlete with the most wins - 1341 - over his career (he retired in 1981 at the age of 53).

Typical race
Keirin races in Japan begin with the cyclists parading to the starting blocks, bowing as they enter the track and again as they position their bikes for the start of the race. Every participant is assigned a number and a colour for identification and betting purposes.

At the sound of the gun, the cyclists leave their starting blocks and settle into a position behind the pacer, who is another keirin bicyclist wearing purple with orange stripes. Cyclists initially settle into different groups, referred to as "lines", where they try to work together with others to maximize their chance of winning.

As the pace quickens, the pacer will usually depart the track with between one and two laps remaining, though the actual location where the pacer leaves varies with every race. With  laps remaining, officials begin sounding a bell or gong, increasing in frequency until the bicyclists come around to begin the final lap.

Keirin ovals are divided into specific areas: The two straightaways (homestretch and backstretch), the four turns (corners), and two locations called the "centre", referring to the area between corners 1 and 2 (1 centre) and corners 3 and 4 (2 centre).

The race is monitored by referees. Two of the referees are stationed in towers along the backstretch (2nd and 3rd corners), while others review the homestretch area from a control room using closed-circuit cameras. Once the race has finished, a referee can signal a possible rule violation by illuminating a red light at the corner nearest to where the infraction may have occurred, or by waving a red flag. Judges then examine the video of the race and decide if a competitor committed a rules violation and should be disqualified. Once the order of finish is finalised, the race is declared official and the winning bets are paid.

Ranks
There are a total of six ranks that competitors can obtain in Japanese keirin racing. SS is the highest rank, followed by S1, S2, A1, A2 and A3. All new keirin graduates begin their careers with an A3 rank and work their way up by competing in keirin events.

The color of the shorts worn by each keirin competitor indicates rank. Those in A-class (A1, A2, A3) wear black shorts with a green stripe and white stars. S-class competitors (S1 and S2) wear a red stripe instead of a green stripe. Those in the elite SS class wear red shorts with a black stripe, white stars and special insignia. Introduced in 2007, the SS ranking is assigned by the NJS every December to the top nine Keirin athletes. These nine compete in that year's Keirin Grand Prix and retain their rank until the following December.

Distances
The distance of each race depends on gender and rank. For men, distances for those ranked A3 are at 1,600 meters, while all others compete at 2,000 meters. The finals of some of the top graded events are run at a longer distance of 2,400 meters. The season-ending Keirin Grand Prix is held at 2,800 meters.

All events for women are currently run at 1,600 meters. There are usually small variances in distance based on the size of the track.

Race grades
A race meeting at any given keirin velodrome in Japan is assigned a grade. The highest graded events are GP, GI (G1), GII (G2) and GIII (G3), reserved only for S-class riders. Underneath those are FI (F1) events, which are open to both S-class and A-class riders. The lowest graded events, FII (F2), are reserved for A-class riders.

The GP grade designation is reserved for the Keirin Grand Prix, a three-day meet held at the end of December for the year's top keirin competitors. The meet ultimately concludes with the Grand Prix race itself, which determines the annual Keirin racing champion.

As of 2018, a selection committee determines the competitors for the Grand Prix race using the following priority:

 Winners of each of the six GI events during the year,
 Japanese medal winners of individual cycling events during the Summer Olympic Games, if they are held in the same year,
 Competitors specifically recognized by the selection committee, and
 Competitors that have earned the most prize money from Keirin events during the year.

Also part of the Grand Prix meet is the Young Grand Prix, which is open to the best of those that have begun competing in Keirin within the last three years; it is the only Keirin race of the year in which both S-class and A-class compete in the same race. A new addition to the meet in 2012 was the Girls' Grand Prix for the sport's top female competitors.

Another prestigious event on the annual keirin racing calendar is the GI Japan Championship. Held every May over a period of six days, it is the longest single race meeting of the year.

Each of the keirin velodromes are generally permitted to host one event per year of either GI, GII or GIII designation. The remaining events at each track consist of a combination of FI and FII races for a total of approximately 70 race days per year. On average there is one GI or GII event every month and one GIII meeting per week on the annual calendar.

Top Keirin events
As of 2019, the top events on the Keirin racing calendar are as follows:

Race schedule
Keirin velodromes follow the same basic schedule of races when conducting a race meeting. On the first day of competition, the better keirin competitors are assigned to races of higher caliber, while others are assigned to low-caliber races. Keirin racers are guaranteed to compete on each day of the meeting unless they are disqualified from a race or retire from the meet for any reason - in which case alternate competitors are called up to fill in the lower-caliber races.

Below is a schedule of races conducted during a typical three-day FI event (open to both S-class and A-class riders).

Day 1
Races 1–5:  (low caliber)
First four or five finishers in each race advance to Day 2 Semifinals
Race 6:  (high caliber)
All riders compete in Day 2 Semifinals

After six races, S-class riders compete:
Races 7–10: 
First three or four finishers in each race advance to Day 2 Semifinals
Race 11: 
All riders compete in Day 2 Semifinals

Day 2
Races 1–2: 
First two finishers in each race advance to Day 3 Special
Race 3: 
First five finishers advance to Day 3 Special
Races 4–6: 
First three finishers in each race advance to Day 3 Final

S-class riders then compete to advance:
Races 7–8: 
First one or two finishers in each race advance to Day 3 Special
Races 9–11: 
First three finishers in each race advance to Day 3 Final

Day 3
Races 1–2: 
Races 3–5: 
Races 6–7: 
Race 8: 
Race 9: 
Race 10: 
Race 11:

Equipment

As a result of the parimutuel gambling that surrounds keirin racing in Japan, a strict system of standards was developed for bicycles and repair tools. The Nihon Jitensha Shinkōkai (Japanese Bicycle Association or NJS) - now under the JKA Foundation - requires that all keirin racers in Japan ride and use equipment that meets their standards. All riders use very similar bicycles, so that no rider will have any advantage or disadvantage based on equipment. In addition, all riders must pass strict licensing requirements.

Those who wish to race in Japan must attend the Japan Bicycle Racing School where they learn the necessary rules, etiquette, and skills. The school typically accepts only 10% of applicants. Those who pass final examination must still be approved by the Japan Keirin Association.

All bicycles and equipment must be built within strict guidelines set by the NJS, by a certified builder using NJS-approved materials. The products are then stamped by NJS and only equipment bearing this stamp may be used. Exceptions to this are a very limited set of equipment including carbon wheels, tires, stems and saddles used in Girls' Keirin, which can be used without NJS certification. The NJS standard is to ensure that no rider will have any advantage or disadvantage based on equipment and does not necessarily relate to quality or standard of manufacture. For example, 36 spoke wheels are allowed but not 32, although 32 spoke wheels are typically lighter, and frames must be built by a very limited number of approved builders.

Since its beginning, the bicycle frames used in Keirin races have been made from chromoly steel. Exceptions to this are frames used in Girls' Keirin, and Keirin Evolution races, where the frames used are made from carbon-fiber. Manufacturers of the frames used in Girls' Keirin are Boma, Bridgestone, Gan Well, Kalavinka, Bomber, and MBK. Participants in Keirin Evolution races may use any NJS, UCI or JCF approved carbon frame and components.

NJS approved equipment often sells for more than comparable equipment because of its specific use, build requirements, and limited manufacturers. Popular manufacturers include Nagasawa, 3Rensho, Makino, Kalavinka, Level, Bridgestone, Panasonic, Samson, Shimano, Nitto, Hatta, MKS, Kashimax, and Sugino. Because the NJS's main objective is supporting the Japanese cycling market, its bureaucracy is notoriously critical of foreign manufacturers attempting to enter the Japanese market. The Italian cycling equipment manufacturer Campagnolo has, though, received NJS certification.

NJS-approved equipment is not required for keirin races sanctioned by the Union Cycliste Internationale or its local national sporting associations, including UCI-sanctioned races in Japan.

Betting
Bets that can be made on Keirin races include, but are not limited to:
  – selecting the first two finishers in exact order
  – first two finishers in any order
  – first three finishers in exact order
  – first three finishers in any order
  - selecting two to finish in the top three, in any order.
Some wagers cannot be placed if there is a small number of competitors in the race.

During major race meets, some jackpot wagers are offered:
 Dokanto! 4 two – selecting the first and second-place finisher in each of the last four races of the day.
 Dokanto! 7 – selecting the winner of each of the last seven races of the day.

The money bet into the Dokanto wagers can carry over if there are no winning tickets, even to subsequent race meets at another velodrome in the country.

In extraordinary circumstances, races have been declared no-contests, forcing velodromes to refund millions of yen in bets. A race at Shizuoka velodrome on 2 January 2008 was declared a failure when the back wheel of the pacer's bicycle nicked the bicycle of an actual competitor, causing him to fall. In a race at Iwaki-Taira Velodrome on 14 December 2008, separate infractions resulted in the disqualification of the entire field; all but one of the competitors were handed a one-year suspension by the velodrome after the race. The suspensions were lifted four months later.

See also
Motor-paced racing
Single-speed bicycle
UCI Track Cycling World Championships – Men's sprint
UCI Track Cycling World Championships – Men's keirin
UCI Track Cycling World Championships – Women's keirin
BMX racing

References

External links

Keirin's official website in Japan 

 
Cycle racing in Japan
Events in track cycling
Individual sports
Sports originating in Japan